Os Cariocas are a Brazilian popular music band. The band was first founded in 1942 by Ismael Neto, and continues to perform today (with new members).

Música popular brasileira musical groups
Musical groups established in 1942
Brazilian musical groups
1942 establishments in Brazil